Prabhatsinh Pratapsinh Chauhan is a member of the 15th Lok Sabha of India. He represented the Panchmahal constituency of Gujarat and is a member of the Bharatiya Janata Party (BJP) political party.

Education and background
Chauhan was educated at Shri K.K. High School, Vejalpur in Panchmahal. Highest qualification attained by him is HSSC (10th). He was an agriculturist, educationist & social worker before joining politics.

Posts held

See also

List of members of the 15th Lok Sabha of India
Politics of India
Parliament of India
Government of India

References

External links
 Official biographical sketch in Parliament of India website

India MPs 2009–2014
Living people
1941 births
Lok Sabha members from Gujarat
People from Panchmahal district
India MPs 2014–2019
Gujarati people
Bharatiya Janata Party politicians from Gujarat